SS Vaterland was a transatlantic ocean liner that was launched for the Hamburg America Line in 1940 but left incomplete because of the Second World War. An Allied air raid damaged her in 1943, and she was scrapped in 1948.

She was the second Vaterland to be built for HAPAG. The first was launched in 1913, seized by the United States in 1917, renamed , and used as a US troop ship and ocean liner.

Background
After the Treaty of Versailles was signed in June 1919, the Allies seized many German merchant ships as part of World War I reparations. HAPAG lost almost its entire fleet, including its three large s , Vaterland and the uncompleted Bismarck. In the 1920s HAPAG re-established a fleet of transatlantic liners of intermediate size and speed, but no very large or very fast ships.

HAPAG's rival Norddeutscher Lloyd introduced the large and fast  in 1929 and her sister  in 1930, each of which won the Blue Riband. The Italian  introduced in 1932, French  introduced in 1935 and British  introduced in 1936 were all also large transatlantic liners that won the Blue Riband during the 1930s.

HAPAG responded by planning a set of three new liners for its Hamburg – Hoboken route. They would be smaller than their British, French, German and Italian competitors, but they would be the largest ships in the HAPAG fleet, and they would be fast enough for three ships to maintain weekly departures in both directions.

Building and loss
Blohm+Voss in Hamburg, who had launched the first Vaterland in 1913, laid down the new Vaterland in 1938 and launched her in 1940. Work on her was stopped because of the war. The uncompleted ship was laid up in the Kuhwerder area of Hamburg.

Vaterland was to have berths for 1,313 passengers: 354 first class, 435 tourist class and 533 third class. She was to have turbo-electric transmission, with steam turbines driving alternators to power electric motors.

In 1941 the German government formed a new Deutsche Amerika Linie, based in Bremen, to consolidate HAPAG and NDL's North Atlantic services. When completed, Vaterland was to be part of this new united fleet.

In July 1943, RAF Bomber Command and the USAAF Eighth Air Force bombed Hamburg for several days to destroy the city. On 25 July Vaterland was badly damaged, with her foredeck torn back so far that it covered her bridge. She lay unrepaired until 1948, when she was scrapped.

References

Bibliography

Maritime incidents in July 1943
Ocean liners
Ships built in Hamburg
Ships of the Hamburg America Line
Steamships of Germany
World War II passenger ships of Germany